X is a 2022 slasher film written, directed, produced and edited by Ti West. It stars Mia Goth in dual roles: a young woman named Maxine and Pearl, an elderly woman. The film also stars Jenna Ortega, Martin Henderson, Brittany Snow, Owen Campbell, Stephen Ure, and Scott Mescudi appearing in supporting roles. The film follows a cast and crew who gather to make a pornographic film on an elderly couple's rural Texas property, but find themselves threatened by an unlikely killer.

X was filmed in New Zealand, with production primarily in Fordell, near Whanganui. The score was composed by Tyler Bates and Chelsea Wolfe, who collaborated to create a soundtrack with emphasis on vocals and synthesizers. The film had its world premiere at South by Southwest (SXSW) on March 13, 2022, and was theatrically released in the United States on March 18, 2022, by A24. It received generally positive reviews, with critics praising its homages to twentieth-century slasher films, particularly 1974's The Texas Chain Saw Massacre, and the performances of Goth, Snow, and Ortega.

X is the first in a film series of the same name, consisting of a prequel film titled Pearl released on September 16, 2022, and a sequel titled MaXXXine in development.

Plot 
In 1979, police officers arrive on a desolate farm in rural Texas and find numerous dead bodies wrapped in bags. They enter the farmhouse and find something shocking in the basement.

24 hours earlier, aspiring adult film star Maxine embarks on a road trip with her producer boyfriend Wayne, fellow actors Bobby-Lynne and Jackson, amateur director RJ, and RJ's girlfriend Lorraine, to shoot a pornographic film. Bobby-Lynne and Jackson strike up a romance, while RJ attempts to make the film seem like a serious cinematic work of art, and Lorraine, who assists with equipment and lighting, is unimpressed.

The group arrive at a farm owned by Howard and Pearl, an elderly couple who have a guest house where they intend to shoot the movie. While the crew film a sex scene between Bobby-Lynne and Jackson, Maxine wanders around the property and discovers a large lake; she goes for a relaxing swim, unknowingly watched by Pearl from a distance, and also a large alligator. Upon returning to the house, Maxine is invited in by Pearl, where she expresses envy for Maxine's youth and makes a sexual advance towards her. Howard comes home and Maxine sneaks out.

Maxine returns to the guest house where she and Jackson shoot a sex scene in the barn; unseen by the group, Pearl watches from outside and is highly aroused, imagining herself in Maxine's position. She then returns home and pleads with Howard to have sex but he refuses, claiming his heart is too weak. Night falls and the group unwind in the guesthouse. Lorraine, keen to shed her reputation as a prude, asks to participate in a scene; RJ initially refuses but, after being persuaded by Wayne, films Lorraine and Jackson having sex. Later, devastated, RJ sets out to leave the group stranded at the farm while they are asleep, but is stopped by Pearl who attempts to seduce him. When he rebuffs her, she stabs him repeatedly in the neck until he is decapitated.

Noticing RJ is missing, Lorraine enlists Wayne’s help in finding him. Wayne searches the barn and steps on a large nail. He then sees something moving outside and, when he peeps through a hole in the door, Pearl shoves a pitchfork through and into his eyes, killing him instantly. Meanwhile, Howard invites Lorraine into their house, claiming Pearl has gone missing. He asks Lorraine to retrieve a flashlight from the basement; she goes down and discovers a naked male corpse hanging from the ceiling.

Howard goes to the guest house and asks Jackson to help him find Pearl. When they split up to scout the lake's perimeter, Jackson finds a submerged car in the water. Howard throws his flashlight into the lake, tricking Jackson to go in to retrieve it, hoping he will be attacked by the alligator lurking nearby. Jackson makes it out but is confronted by Howard who shoots him in the chest, blowing his body back into the lake. Meanwhile, Pearl sneaks into the guest house, undresses, and climbs into bed with Maxine, caressing her body. Maxine awakens in horror to find Pearl lying next to her, waking Bobby-Lynne.

Back in the house, Lorraine breaks through the basement door with a hatchet but Howard attacks, breaking her fingers with the butt of his shotgun. Bobby-Lynne finds Pearl standing on the edge of the lake. Thinking she has dementia, Bobby-Lynne tries to help her, only for Pearl to slap her, insult her and push her into the water. The alligator bites down on her head and then kills her with a death roll. Pearl and Howard return to the guest house and have sex, while Maxine hides under the bed. Maxine manages to escape to the van where she finds RJ's decapitated corpse and the vehicle's tires slashed. She arms herself with a pistol from the glovebox and enters the house to free a traumatized Lorraine from the basement. Lorraine attempts to flee from the house but is shot in the head by Howard. As the couple begin moving her body, the dying Lorraine twitches, startling Howard and causing him to suffer a heart attack and die.

Maxine retrieves the keys to Howard's truck and attempts to shoot Pearl but the pistol is not loaded. Pearl then tries to shoot Maxine with Howard's shotgun; she dodges the bullet, and the blast sends Pearl out the front door onto the porch, breaking her hip. As Pearl lies in pain, she begs Maxine for help. As Maxine gets into Howard's truck, Pearl starts to berate and insult her. Maxine then reverses the truck and runs over Pearl, crushing her head before driving away.

The following morning, the police arrive at the house and find the bodies. It is revealed on Pearl and Howard's television set that Maxine is the daughter of a fanatical Christian preacher whose speeches frequently played throughout the film. The police discover RJ's camera and speculate about what it contains, with the sheriff deducing it contains footage of "one goddamn fucked up horror picture."

Cast

 Mia Goth as Maxine / Pearl
 Jenna Ortega as Lorraine 
 Brittany Snow as Bobby-Lynne 
 Scott Mescudi as Jackson 
 Martin Henderson as Wayne 
 Owen Campbell as RJ
 Stephen Ure as Howard
 Simon Prast as the televangelist
 James Gaylyn as Sheriff Dentler.

Themes and influences
Nate Roscoe of Fangoria wrote in an essay on the film that X exemplifies a modern take on the psycho-biddy horror subgenre, in which aging or elderly women portray grotesque, violent characters. Roscoe also notes that the film's primary theme revolves around aging, youth, and longing over the past. "Snatching its inspo from the shadiest recesses of art and exploitation, it is the relationship between beauty, aging and self-worth that creeps most conspicuously through the architecture of X." He also notes that the film presents its antagonist—the murderous Pearl—in a manner that is sympathetic, writing that, at moments, "one can't help but feel crushingly sorry for this tragic figure."

Critics noted the influence of several films on X, with multiple commentators observing homages to the 1974 film The Texas Chain Saw Massacre. Other films cited by critics as having an influence on X include Psycho (1960), Hardcore (1979), The Shining, Alligator (both 1980), and Boogie Nights (1997). Richard Roeper wrote that X also contains "echoes" of such pornographic films as Blue Movie (1969) and Debbie Does Dallas (1978).

Production
In November 2020, it was announced that A24 would produce a horror film titled X, which would be written and directed by Ti West and star Mia Goth, Scott Mescudi (who also executive produces) and Jenna Ortega. In February 2021, Brittany Snow joined the cast.

Principal photography took place from February 16 to March 16, 2021, in New Zealand's North Island.

A number of scenes were shot in and around the city of Whanganui. Production was predominantly based at a farm in the settlement of Fordell, where a large barn was constructed as part of the production. Photography also took place near the Rangitīkei town of Bulls, where producers made use of an old town hall.

Special effects
Goth donned extensive prosthetic makeup to portray the elderly Pearl. Describing her experience, Goth stated, "It was a good 10 hours in the makeup chair, and then I'd go and do a 12-hour day on set, and the makeup artist, Sarah Rubano, who was incredible, would constantly be touching me up and making sure my contacts were all right and all those sorts of things."

The scene in which Pearl stabs RJ in the neck involved the use of a retractable prop knife, a prosthetic neck with a slit in it, and tubing to allow the passage of stage blood through the slit. The effect of RJ's subsequent decapitation was accomplished using a dummy head of RJ, with a stunt performer and a false floor; the stunt performer lay on his back, with his head and shoulders beneath the false floor and concealed by a prosthetic upper body. The performer then twitched his body during the filming of the scene, which, when paired with the disembodied dummy head, creates the illusion of RJ's body continuing to twitch after death. For the scene in which Pearl stabs Wayne in the eyes with a pitchfork, a dummy of Wayne's upper body and head was constructed by the Netherlands-based MimicFX Studio.

Music

The film's score was composed by Tyler Bates and Chelsea Wolfe, and features a cover version of "Oui, Oui, Marie" performed by Wolfe, which was released as a digital single on March 11, 2022. Bates said that the pair intended to "create a vocal-centric score framed with organic synthesizers and atmospheres that evoke a sonic aesthetic of ’70s arthouse horror films". Wolfe, who had not soundtracked a film before, primarily contributed her voice to the score, and attempted to use non-singing sounds to emulate the character's emotions. Bates compared the score to that somewhere between that of Debbie Does Dallas and Rosemary's Baby.

Aside from the score by Bates and Wolfe, the film incorporates a number of songs from the 1960s and 1970s, including "In the Summertime" by Mungo Jerry, "Act Naturally" by Loretta Lynn, and "(Don't Fear) The Reaper" by Blue Öyster Cult. Additionally, one scene in the film features Jackson (Scott Mescudi) and Bobby-Lynne (Brittany Snow) performing "Landslide" by Fleetwood Mac, with the former playing acoustic guitar and the latter providing vocals.

Release

Theatrical
X premiered at the 2022 South by Southwest (SXSW) festival on March 13, 2022. The film was released in the United States on March 18, 2022.

Home media
The film was released on video on demand services (including Apple TV, Amazon Prime Video, Google Play, YouTube, and VUDU) on April 14, 2022. It was released on Blu-ray and DVD on May 24, 2022, by Lionsgate Home Entertainment.

Reception

Box office
X grossed $11.8 million in the United States and Canada, and $3.3 million in other territories, for a worldwide total of $15.1 million, making it a box office success against its mere $1 million budget.

In the United States and Canada, X was released alongside Jujutsu Kaisen 0, The Outfit, and Umma, and was projected to gross $2–5 million in its opening weekend. The film earned $4.3 million from 2,865 theaters in its opening weekend, finishing fourth. Men made up 55% of the audience during its opening, with those in the age range of 18–34 comprising 73% of ticket sales. The ethnic breakdown of the audience showed that 50% were Caucasian, 22% Hispanic and Latino Americans, 12% African American, and 16% Asian or other. The film made $2.2 million in its second weekend and $1 million in its third. It dropped out of the box office top ten in its fourth weekend with $359,067 (a drop of 65%).

Critical response
On the review aggregator website Rotten Tomatoes, the film has an approval rating of 94% based on 222 reviews, with an average rating of 7.7/10. The website's critics consensus reads: "A fresh spin on the classic slasher formula, X marks the spot where Ti West gets resoundingly back to his horror roots." On Metacritic, which uses a weighted average, the film has a score of 79 out of 100 based on 35 critics, indicating "generally favorable reviews". Audiences polled by PostTrak gave the film a 68% positive score, with 45% saying they would definitely recommend it.

Reviewing the film following its SXSW premiere, Owen Gleiberman of Variety called it "a deliberate, loving, and meticulous homage" to 1974's The Texas Chain Saw Massacre, as well as "a wily and entertaining slow-motion ride of terror that earns its shocks, along with its singular quease factor, which relates to the fact that the demons here are ancient specimens of humanity who actually have a touch of... humanity." John DeFore of The Hollywood Reporter commended the film's cast and noted that, "Before the gore begins (and even mid-action), West seems to truly consider the pain of irretrievable youth, and feel for those whose final years are consumed by it." The A.V. Clubs Todd Gilchrist gave the film a grade of "B+", writing that it "examines the way that youth in others seems to bring out the feeling and impact of age in ourselves, not to mention how we resist or respond to that when it happens," and calling it "bloody, ballsy fun". Abby Olcese, writing for RogerEbert.com, gave the film a score of three out of four stars, concluding: "X is plenty of fun; it also feels like a trifle that could easily have been much more."

Upon release, The Atlantics David Sims called the film "a modern classic", comparing it with 2022's Texas Chainsaw Massacre, which he felt failed creatively compared to X. Richard Roeper of the Chicago Sun-Times awarded the film three-and-a-half out of four stars, calling it "the kind of movie that has you reeling in disgust at certain moments, then laughing at the blood-spattered absurdity of it all. It's a new twist on the period-piece slasher movie, smart and strange and fantastically depraved." A.O. Scott, in a review of the film for The New York Times, wrote that X "isn't shy about appealing to voyeurism. There's nothing coy or arty about the bloodletting. [...] West, unlike his pornographers, has things to say as well as bodies to show. Most of all, he has an aesthetic that isn't all about terror or titillation. X is full of dreamy, haunting overhead shots and moments of surprising tenderness."

Valerie Complex of Deadline Hollywood referred to the film as "a new love letter to the slasher film genre", writing: "I give West credit for having a vision and sticking to his influences. He knows what he wants to do and how to execute it unapologetically. X is surface-level entertainment [...] but still a satisfying piece of indie horror filmmaking that's worth taking a chance on." Dmitry Samarov of the Chicago Reader gave the film a mostly negative review, writing that "even the most casual horror fan won't miss" the references that X makes to 1974's Texas Chain Saw Massacre, but that, "unlike Tobe Hooper's masterpiece, which has a point to make about economic desperation and cultural clash in 70s America, West just wants to punish everyone involved in gory ways played for laughs."

Accolades

Related works

In March 2022, it was revealed that a prequel film, Pearl, was secretly shot back-to-back with the first film. West directed and co-wrote the film with Goth. Principal photography took place in New Zealand, and upon official announcement was already in the post-production stage. Goth reprises her role as a younger-aged Pearl. A24 produced the project, with Jacob Jaffke, Harrison Kreiss and Kevin Turen serving as producers, and West, Goth, Mescudi and Sam Levinson as executive producers. A sneak preview was also shown in X'''s post-credits scene for North American releases only. Pearl was released theatrically in North America on September 16, 2022, approximately six months after the release of X.

A third installment in the series, MaXXXine, was announced shortly before the release of Pearl, which will focus on the Maxine character in 1980s Los Angeles, following the events depicted in X''.

References

External links
 

2022 films
2022 horror thriller films
2022 independent films
2020s American films
2020s English-language films
2020s erotic thriller films
2020s serial killer films
2020s slasher films
A24 (company) films
American erotic horror films
American erotic thriller films
American horror thriller films
American independent films
American serial killer films
American slasher films
Films about films
Films about old age
Films about pornography
Films directed by Ti West
Films scored by Tyler Bates
Films set in 1979
Films set in Texas
Films set on farms
Films shot in New Zealand
Mad Solar productions
Psycho-biddy films